This is a list of parks and gardens in Malaysia.

Lists

Kuala Lumpur
Most public parks in Kuala Lumpur are managed by the Landscape and Recreation Development Department, Kuala Lumpur City Hall.
 Perdana Botanical Garden
 Rimba Ilmu Botanical Gardens
 Kuala Lumpur Bird Park
 Kuala Lumpur Butterfly Park
 Kuala Lumpur Orchid Garden
 Kuala Lumpur Hibiscus Garden
 Kuala Lumpur Deer Park
 KLCC Park
 Titiwangsa Lake Gardens
 KL Forest Eco Park
 Forest Research Institute Malaysia (FRIM)
 Kepong Metropolitan Park
 Bukit Jalil Park
 Ampang Hilir Lake Garden
 Lembah Kiara Recreational Park
 Alam Damai Park
 Bukit Kiara Arboretum Park
 Taman Rimba Bukit Kiara
 Pudu Ulu Recreational Park
 Permaisuri Lake Gardens
 Datuk Keramat Lake Gardens
 Metropolitan Batu Park

Malacca
 Malacca Botanical Garden
 Garden of Thousand Flowers
 Datuk Wira Poh Ah Tiam Machap Recreational Park

Pahang
 Raub Lake Park

Penang
 Penang Botanic Gardens

Perak
 Taiping Lake Gardens

Sabah
 Likas Bay Park
 Perdana Park
 Prince Philip Park
 Tun Fuad Stephens Park

Selangor
 National Botanical Garden Shah Alam (TBNSA)
 Mimaland

See also
 List of national parks in Malaysia

References

Lists of tourist attractions in Malaysia
Malaysia
Malaysia